Thermosediminibacterales is an order of Gram positive bacteria in the class Clostridia.

References 

Bacteria orders
Clostridia
Thermophiles
Anaerobes